Euchorthippus elegantulus is a species of slant-faced grasshopper in the family Acrididae. It is found in Europe.

The IUCN conservation status of Euchorthippus elegantulus is "LC", least concern, with no immediate threat to the species' survival. The IUCN status was assessed in 2015.

Subspecies
These subspecies belong to the species Euchorthippus elegantulus:
 Euchorthippus elegantulus elegantulus Zeuner, 1940 (Elegant Straw Grasshopper)
 Euchorthippus elegantulus gallicus Maran, 1957

References

Further reading

External links

 

elegantulus
Insects described in 1940
Orthoptera of Europe